Havina Hede is a 1981 Indian Kannada-language action film directed by V. Somashekhar and produced by Parvathamma Rajkumar. The film featured Rajkumar and Sulakshana playing the pivotal roles. The film was written by M. D. Sundar and had lyrics and dialogues written by Chi. Udaya Shankar.

The film featured a successful original score and soundtrack composed by G. K. Venkatesh. Rajkumar also appeared as Bhima in a small drama sequence in the movie.

Cast 

 Rajkumar as Muthanna
 Sulakshana as Rani ( Voice dubbed by B. Jayashree )
 Sampath
 Shakti Prasad
 Thoogudeepa Srinivas 
 Tiger Prabhakar as Antony
 Uma Shivakumar
 M. S. Umesh
 B. V. Radha
 Maanu
 Sudheer
 Dinesh as Narayana
 R. N. Sudarshan as Shyam
 Papamma

Soundtrack 
The music was composed by G. K. Venkatesh to the lyrics of Chi. Udaya Shankar.

References

External links 
 
 Songs

1981 films
1980s Kannada-language films
Indian drama films
Films scored by G. K. Venkatesh
Films directed by V. Somashekhar
1981 drama films